King Air Charter is a charter airline, based in Lanseria, South Africa.

Fleet
The King Air Charter fleet consists of the following aircraft (at March 2008):

3 McDonnell Douglas DC-9-32 (two aircraft are operated for 1Time)

External links
King Air Charter
King Air Charter Fleet

Airlines of South Africa